Pavel Vyacheslavovich Kotov (born 18 November 1998) is a Russian tennis player. Kotov has a career high ATP singles ranking of World No. 96 achieved on 17 October 2022. He also has a career high doubles ranking of World No. 226 achieved on 8 November 2021.

Career

2020-2021: ATP debut, Maiden Challengers in singles & doubles 
He made his ATP debut at the 2020 St. Petersburg Open as a qualifier where he was defeated by Ugo Humbert.

Kotov won his maiden ATP Challenger doubles title at the 2020 Challenger La Manche and maiden single title at the 2021 Città di Forlì III.

2022-2023: Grand Slam and top 100 debuts
He won his second singles Challenger title at 2022 Città di Forlì III. He reached the top 150 on 16 May 2022 at World No. 143.

At the 2022 French Open he qualified to make his Grand Slam main draw debut.

He made his debut at the US Open as a qualifier.

He qualified into the main draw at the ATP 500 2022 Astana Open as lucky loser after the late withdrawal of Jannik Sinner. In the first round he defeated Alejandro Davidovich Fokina for his first win at this level. As a result he moved to the top 100 in the rankings on 10 October 2022.

He made his debut at the 2023 Australian Open as a lucky loser.

He also qualified at the ATP 500 in Dubai and defeated Alexei Popyrin.

Challenger and Futures Final

Singles: 9 (6–3)

Doubles: 1 (1 title)

References

External links
 
 

1998 births
Living people
Russian male tennis players
Tennis players from Moscow